"Honolulu City Lights" is a song composed by Hawaiian singer/songwriter Keola Beamer (b. 1951) in the 1970s which opens an album by the same name.  The album won several of the Hawaiian music industry's Na Hoku Hanohano Awards in 1979, among them that for Best Contemporary Hawaiian Album, and both song and album went on to become one of the most popular and most played works of contemporary Hawaiian music. It has also become a Christmas music standard and is played on heritage radio station KSSK on its Christmas Music format during the Holiday season from November to December along with a handful of other Hawaiian standards and/or artists.  A month long Christmas event in December that takes place in downtown Honolulu is also called Honolulu City Lights which began in 1985, but adopted the name officially in 1987.  

A contemporary remake of the song was recorded by Richard and Karen Carpenter in 1978, but was not released until 1986 on single, and 1989 on album.

The Beamer Brothers album was re-released in 1999 as "Honolulu City Lights – 20th Anniversary" but listed as "Honolulu City Lights – 20th Anniversary" in leading catalogs and remains in print as of 2009.

Carpenters' version
According to the official website, Richard and Karen were vacationing in Hawaii in 1977 when they heard Keola Beamer's "Honolulu City Lights". They liked it and wanted to record it, eventually recording it at the same session as "Slow Dance".

The recording was not commercially released until three years after Karen Carpenter's death. 
They finally released it in 1986, three years before it was released on the Lovelines album.

Personnel
Karen Carpenter – lead vocals
Richard Carpenter – keyboards
Joe Osborn – bass guitar
Ron Tutt – drums
Tim May – acoustic guitar
Jay Dee Maness – pedal steel guitar
Earle Dumler – English horn
Gayle Levant – harp
The O.K. Singers – backing vocals

The Carpenters songs
1986 singles
Culture of Honolulu
Na Hoku Hanohano Award-winning albums
1978 songs